The church of Santa María de Lara, also known as the Ermita de Santa María, is one of the last surviving Visigoth churches on the Iberian Peninsula, located near the village of Quintanilla de las Viñas, not far from the city of Burgos, in the Castile and León region in Spain, Archeologists have yet to confirm its period of construction but the church has been placed by scholars between the 7th century, where it is more frequently located, and the 10th century. The church is notable not only for its age and architectural type, but also because it is believed to contain the earliest representation of Christ in Spanish religious art. It was classified as a national monument on November 25, 1929.

History

Early history
The geographical area surrounding Santa María De Lara was populated by numerous Roman villae preceding the construction of the church. After the Visigoths had invaded the Iberian Peninsula (particularly the area we now know as Spain) and the Romans had left the area, they settled in Quintillana de las Vinas and built the church of Santa María De Lara around the beginning of the 8th century. Soon afterwards, in 711 AD, the Moors invaded the Iberian Peninsula and Lara was abandoned as the populace fled north to the Picos de Europa mountains.

In the 9th century, during the Spanish Reconquista, the areas that were previously abandoned (such as Lara) were repopulated, although the buildings were largely in ruins. Santa María De Lara was neglected during the period of Moorish rule, and therefore the church had to be rebuilt. A funerary stela that is now housed in the Museum of Burgos that has been studied by archeologists is believed to record the date of the reconstruction of Santa María De Lara. It is inscribed with the letters DCCCC (...), and despite the only partial remnant of the date, it is widely believed that this refers to the year 902 (bearing in mind that the inscription adheres to the Spanish medieval dating system, from which 38 years must be subtracted to obtain the European chronological year).

A document that has been dated from the year 967 AD (or the Spanish Medieval date 929) records a monetary donation to the church and the monastery that, at that time, was under the control of Santa María de Lara, by a woman named Muniadona, the mother of Fernán González of Castile. However, due to the lack of documents from that early era, historians have been unable to verify the location of this monastery.

In 1038, the church was donated to the nearby monastery of San Pedro de Arlanza and from then on the church began a gradual decline both in religious status and architectural stability. Undated documents from the Archbishopric of Burgos later refer to it as a 'hermitage'. After that, the church was abandoned and parts of the building collapsed, and much of its ancient carvings and decoration was lost.

Discovery and modern history
In 1921, a local parish priest was walking near Quintanilla de las Vinas when he came across the remains of Santa María de Lara, forgotten since the early Middle Ages and hidden by thick bush. Don Bonifacio Zamora, the priest, strived to bring his discovery to the interest of historians and experts. However, until 1927, he was unsuccessful and the site was used simply as a corral for livestock. In 1927, the church was finally brought to the attention of experts such as Helmut Schlunk, a notable German scholar who, amongst others, visited this 'newly discovered' Visigoth church in order to research it.

After two years of studying the site, it was granted 'National Monument' status on 25 November 1929. Later, during the 1930s, extensive excavations were carried out that revealed a large amount of data that shows the area was inhabited from early times. The research undertaken in the 1920s and 1930s has given us almost all we know about the church today. Many of the artefacts uncovered, such as funerary stelae, dolmens and objects from Roman villae, are now housed in the 'Museo Provincial de Burgos.'

Up until the 1970s, the church could only be reached by a local road, until Jesus Vicario Moreno, who looked after Santa María de Lara and showed it to visitors until his recent death, oversaw the construction of an asphalt road leading to the church from Quintanilla de las Vinas, where he lived. Tourism and visitors to the site have provided money to keep the church stable and protect it with projects such as the modern wooden roof. The numbers of visitors have increased significantly; in 1992, 8000 tourists were recorded to have visited the site.

Theft and recovery of two reliefs
In 2004, two stones depicting evangelists were stolen from the church. After a tip was received in 2010 that they had been offered for sale as garden reliefs in Great Britain, they were found by Dutch art detective Arthur Brand in a British garden and transferred to the Spanish embassy in January 2019.

Connected historic persons

Lady Flammola
An inscription carved on the right side of the triumphal arch within the church mentions a Lady Flammola.  Translations of the inscription differ, but it is believed that the Latin text, which reads , means, "Flammola, the least of the least, makes this promised offering to God" (an alternate translation is, "This small gift the Lady Flammola offers to God").

Dona Lambra, as modern historians now call this Lady Flammola, may have ordered the restoration of the church in the 10th century and supported it with money she donated.  But, as numerous women dating from that period bore the same name, without a more accurate dating of the inscription scholars have been unable to determine precisely which Flammola ordered the restoration.

Fernán González family
Muniadona features in an early document from 967 AD, which records her giving a donation to the church. Muniadona was the mother of Count Fernán González of Castile (who at that point ruled over Castile).

Fernán González of Castile, the first independent count of Castile, was closely linked to the church, which is evident for three reasons. First, he was a member of the influential Lara family, and shares his name with the church. He grew up in, and later commanded, the castle of Lara, which is visible from Santa María de Lara with favourable weather. He was buried in the monastery of San Pedro de Arlanza, which at that point owned Santa María de Lara.

References

Further reading

External links

Maria Lara
Bien de Interés Cultural landmarks in the Province of Burgos
Visigothic architecture
Christian monasteries established in the 7th century
Christian hermitages in Spain
7th-century churches in Spain